The Newport station  (formerly known as Pavonia–Newport, Pavonia, or Erie) is a station on the PATH system. Located on Town Square Place (formerly Pavonia Avenue) at the corner of Washington Boulevard in the Newport neighborhood of Jersey City, New Jersey, it is served by the Hoboken–World Trade Center and Journal Square–33rd Street lines on weekdays, and by the Journal Square–33rd Street (via Hoboken) line on weekends. , its estimated weekday use was nearly 20,000 passengers, up from 17,000 to 18,000 average weekday passengers in 2010.

History

The station was opened on August 2, 1909, as part of the Hudson and Manhattan Railroad (H&M), originally constructed to connect to the Erie Railroad's Pavonia Terminal. The capitals of the station's columns are adorned with the "E", and recall its original name, Erie. After the Port Authority of New York and New Jersey 1960s takeover of the system, the station was renamed Pavonia, or Pavonia Avenue, itself named for the 17th New Netherland settlement of Pavonia. In 1988, the station became known as Pavonia/Newport to reflect the redevelopment of the former railyards along the banks of the Hudson River to residential, retail, and recreational uses as Newport. In 2010, the name became Newport.

The station has undergone a number of transformations. During the Erie period, the station was so busy that a second platform was added to manage the flow of passengers from the over 30 passenger trains that ran in and out of the station hourly. The desire to reuse old caissons (from previous tunneling attempts) when building the H&M system meant that the tubes at this location were far inland. As a result, the actual station was not closely integrated into the Erie Railroad Terminal above, and the Erie never built a new terminal on top of the underground platforms. Therefore, a lengthy walk through inclined pedestrian tunnels was necessary in order to connect from the H&M to the passenger trains. It was the first such moving walkway built in the United States; built by Goodyear, it moved up a 10 percent grade at a speed of 1.5 mph (2.4 km/h).

In 1956, the Erie Railroad consolidated its operations with the Lackawanna Railroad and moved to Hoboken Terminal. A few years later, the small New York, Susquehanna and Western Railway ceased operations at the Erie Terminal, which was torn down soon afterwards. 

Beginning in the late 1980s, the once-vacant railyards surrounding the station were turned into residential, office, and retail towers, and the neighborhood became known as Newport. As part of the redevelopment, Pavonia Station itself was renamed and underwent extensive renovations, including improved lighting, floors, walls, ceilings, artwork, and the installation of a new headhouse with escalators and elevators. 

The station underwent further renovations in 2001–2003 with the installation of an additional elevator in order to re-open the side platform to regular use after four decades of inactivity.

Station layout
The station has two tracks. There is one island platform serving southbound trains and one side platform serving northbound trains.

Vicinity

Hudson River Waterfront Walkway
Hudson and Manhattan Railroad Powerhouse
Newport Centre
Newport Tower

See also
Spanish solution

References

External links

PATH - Newport
Hudson & Manhattan Railroad/Hudson Tubes
Town Square Place entrance from Google Maps Street View
 Platforms from Google Maps Street View

PATH stations in New Jersey
Transportation in Jersey City, New Jersey
Railway stations in the United States opened in 1909
Railway stations located underground in New Jersey
Railway stations in Hudson County, New Jersey